Alfred Cowles III (September 15, 1891 – December 28, 1984) was an American economist, businessman and founder of the Cowles Commission. He graduated from Yale in 1913, where he was a member of Skull and Bones.

He was the grandson of Alfred Cowles, Sr., who was a founder of the Chicago Tribune. His father, Alfred Cowles, Jr. (1865–1939) managed and directed the Chicago Tribune from 1898 to 1901 and the American Radiator Company. His mother was Elizabeth Cheney (1865–1898). His parents lived at 1130 N. Lake Shore Drive in Chicago, Illinois. Alfred Cowles III had three siblings: Knight Cheney Cowles (born 1892); John Cheney Cowles (born 1894); and Thomas Hooker Cowles (born June 6, 1895) who married Barbara Granger, daughter of architect Alfred Hoyt Granger.

Alfred Cowles was a fellow and treasurer of the Econometric Society.

Selected works

References 

American chief executives
Economists from Illinois
Cowles family
Fellows of the American Association for the Advancement of Science
Fellows of the Econometric Society
Businesspeople from Chicago
People from Colorado
Yale University alumni
1891 births
1984 deaths
20th-century American economists
Grand River Academy alumni
20th-century American businesspeople